Polina Fouda ‘Amru (born 17 June 2003) is an Egyptian rhythmic gymnast. She represented Egypt at the 2020 Summer Olympics.

She competed at the 2020 African Rhythmic Gymnastics Championships in Sharm el-Sheikh, winning three gold medals in the general, in group 5 balls and in group 3 hoops + 2 clubs.

She was selected to represent Egypt at the 2020 Summer Olympics alongside Login Elsasyed, Salma Saleh, Malak Selim, and Tia Sobhy. They finished thirteenth in the qualification round for the group all-around.

References 

Living people
2003 births
Egyptian rhythmic gymnasts
Olympic gymnasts of Egypt
Gymnasts at the 2020 Summer Olympics